Sandi Goldsberry (born September 13, 1955) is an American athlete. She competed in the women's high jump at the 1972 Summer Olympics.

References

External links
 

1955 births
Living people
Athletes (track and field) at the 1972 Summer Olympics
American female high jumpers
Olympic track and field athletes of the United States
Sportspeople from Pasadena, California
21st-century American women